Awakebutstillinbed, stylized as awakebutstillinbed, and abbreviated as absib, is the solo project of American musician Shannon Taylor.

History
Taylor (born November 13, 1991) grew up in Mesquite, Texas, a suburb of Dallas, Texas. Taylor later moved from Mesquite to York, Pennsylvania with her family at the age of fifteen. Later, Taylor moved to San Jose, California, where she currently resides. In January 2018, Taylor released her first album as awakebutstillinbed titled What People Call Low Self-Esteem Is Really Just Seeing Yourself the Way That Other People See You. The album was re-released on Tiny Engines upon Taylor's signing with the label in February. The album received a 7.7 out of 10 rating from Pitchfork. The album was featured at number 98 on Brooklyn Vegan's list titled "100 Best Punk & Emo Albums of the 2010s".

Discography
Studio albums
What People Call Low Self-Esteem Is Really Just Seeing Yourself the Way That Other People See You (2018, Tiny Engines)
Stay Who You Are (2020)

References

American women singer-songwriters
Tiny Engines artists